Kaie Kellough (born 1975) is a Canadian poet and novelist. He was born in Vancouver, British Columbia, raised in Calgary, Alberta, and in 1998 moved to Montreal, Quebec, where he lives.

Kellough has published three books of poetry, two audio recordings, one novel, and one collection of short stories. He is also a practitioner of vocal sound poetry.  His work multiplies and layers voice, while exploring the fundamentals of language-production. His debut novel, Accordéon, was a shortlisted nominee for the Amazon.ca First Novel Award.

His most recent poetry book Magnetic Equator (2019) was shortlisted for the QWF A.M. Klein Award for Poetry that same year, and won the 2020 Griffin Poetry Prize. His short story collection Dominoes at the Crossroads was longlisted for the Giller Prize in 2020 and the ReLit Award for short fiction in 2021, and won the Paragraphe Hugh MacLennan Prize for Fiction at the 2020 Quebec Writers' Federation Awards. The book was a shortlisted finalist for the Danuta Gleed Literary Award in 2021.

Bibliography

Poetry
Lettricity (Cumulus Press 2005)
Maple Leaf Rag (Arbeiter Ring Publishing 2010, shortlisted for the Manuela Dias Design Award, Manitoba Book Awards)
Magnetic Equator (McClelland and Stewart 2019, shortlisted for the 2019 QWF A.M. Klein Award for Poetry, and winner of the 2020 Griffin Poetry Prize)

Audio
Vox:Versus (WOW 2011)
Creole Continuum (HOWL 2014)

Fiction
Accordéon (ARP Books 2016, shortlisted for the 2017 Amazon/Walrus Foundation First Novel Award)
Dominoes at the Crossroads (Véhicule Press 2020, longlisted for the 2020 Giller Prize)

References

External links
Kaie Kellough official website.

1975 births
Living people
21st-century Canadian novelists
21st-century Canadian poets
21st-century Canadian male writers
21st-century Canadian short story writers
Black Canadian writers
Canadian people of Guyanese descent
Canadian male poets
Canadian male novelists
Canadian male short story writers
Sound poets
Writers from Calgary
Writers from Vancouver
Writers from Montreal